Ficus maclellandii (common name Alii fig or banana-leaf fig) is a species of fig plant native to India, Southeast Asia and China. It is an evergreen often grown as a houseplant in temperate climates. The leaves are 8–13 cm and uniquely dimorphic; with narrow leaves on the lower, sterile branches and broader leaves on the higher branches.

Cultivar

The most common cultivar is 'Alii' which was originally introduced in Hawaii. In the past this cultivar was often misidentified as F. binnendijkii or under the spurious name Ficus longifolia.

References

External links
 
 
 
 

maclellandii